Margrethe II (Margrethe Alexandrine Þórhildur Ingrid, born 16 April 1940) is Queen of Denmark. Having reigned as Denmark's monarch for over 50 years, she is Europe's longest-serving current head of state. , she is also the world's only queen regnant.

Born into the House of Glücksburg, a cadet branch of the House of Oldenburg, Margrethe is the eldest child of Frederick IX of Denmark and Ingrid of Sweden. She became heir presumptive to her father in 1953, when a constitutional amendment allowed women to inherit the throne. Margrethe succeeded her father upon his death on 14 January 1972. On her accession, she became the first female monarch of Denmark since Margrethe I, ruler of the Scandinavian kingdoms in 1376–1412 during the Kalmar Union. In 1967, she married Henri de Laborde de Monpezat, with whom she had two sons: Crown Prince Frederik and Prince Joachim.

Margrethe is known for her strong archaeological passion and has participated in several excavations, including in Italy, Egypt, Denmark and South America. She shared this interest with her grandfather Gustaf VI Adolf of Sweden, with whom she spent some time unearthing artefacts near Etruria in 1962.

As of 2023, Margrethe has, as sovereign, received 42 official state visits and she has undertaken 55 foreign state visits herself. She and the royal family have made several other foreign visits. Support for the monarchy in Denmark has been and remains consistently high at around 82%, as does Margrethe's personal popularity.

Early life

Princess Margrethe was born 16 April 1940 at Frederik VIII's Palace, in her parents' residence at the Amalienborg palace complex, the principal residence of the Danish royal family in the district of Frederiksstaden in central Copenhagen. She was the first child of the Crown Prince and Crown Princess (later King Frederick IX and Queen Ingrid). Her father was the elder son of the then-reigning King Christian X, while her mother was the only daughter of the Crown Prince of Sweden (later King Gustaf VI Adolf). Her birth took place just one week after Nazi Germany's invasion of Denmark on 9 April 1940.

Margrethe was baptised on 14 May in the Holmen Church in Copenhagen. The Princess's godparents were King Christian X (paternal grandfather); Hereditary Prince Knud (paternal uncle); Prince Axel (her paternal grandfather's first cousin); King Gustaf V of Sweden (maternal great-grandfather); Crown Prince Gustaf Adolf of Sweden (maternal grandfather); Prince Gustaf Adolf, Duke of Västerbotten (her maternal uncle); and Prince Arthur, Duke of Connaught and Strathearn (maternal great-grandfather).

She was named Margrethe after her late maternal grandmother, Crown Princess Margaret of Sweden, Alexandrine after her paternal grandmother, Queen Alexandrine, and Ingrid after her mother. Since her paternal grandfather was also the King of Iceland, she was given the Icelandic name Þórhildur.

When Margrethe was four years old, in 1944, her younger sister Princess Benedikte was born. Princess Benedikte later married Prince Richard of Sayn-Wittgenstein-Berleburg and lives some of the time in Germany. Her second sister, Princess Anne-Marie, was born in 1946. Anne-Marie later married King Constantine II of the Hellenes and currently lives in Greece.

Margrethe and her sisters grew up in apartments at Frederick VIII's Palace at Amalienborg in Copenhagen and in Fredensborg Palace in North Zealand. She spent summer holidays with the royal family in her parents' summer residence at Gråsten Palace in Southern Jutland. On 20 April 1947, King Christian X died and Margrethe's father ascended the throne as King Frederick IX.

To her family and close friends, Margrethe is known affectionately as "Daisy."

Heir presumptive

At the time of her birth, only males could ascend the throne of Denmark, owing to the changes in succession laws enacted in the 1850s when the Glücksburg branch was chosen to succeed. As Margrethe had no brothers, it was assumed that her uncle Prince Knud would one day assume the throne.

The process of changing the constitution started in 1947, not long after Margrethe's father ascended the throne and it became clear that Queen Ingrid would have no more children. The popularity of Frederick and his daughters and the more prominent role of women in Danish life started the complicated process of altering the constitution. The law required that the proposal be passed by two successive Parliaments and then by a referendum, which occurred 27 March 1953. The new Act of Succession permitted female succession to the throne of Denmark, according to male-preference cognatic primogeniture, where a female can ascend to the throne only if she does not have a brother. Princess Margrethe therefore became heir presumptive. In 2009, the law of succession was modified into absolute primogeniture.

On her eighteenth birthday, 16 April 1958, Margrethe was given a seat in the Council of State. She subsequently chaired the meetings of the Council in the absence of the King.

In 1960, together with the princesses of Sweden and Norway, she travelled to the United States, which included a visit to Los Angeles, and to the Paramount Studios, where they met several celebrities, including Dean Martin, Jerry Lewis and Elvis Presley.

Education
Margrethe was educated at the private school N. Zahle's School in Copenhagen, from which she graduated in 1959. She spent a year at North Foreland Lodge, a boarding school for girls in Hampshire, England, and later studied prehistoric archaeology at Girton College, Cambridge, during 1960–1961, political science at Aarhus University between 1961 and 1962, attended the Sorbonne in 1963, and was at the London School of Economics in 1965. She is a Fellow of the Society of Antiquaries of London.

Margrethe is fluent in Danish, French, English, Swedish and German, and has a limited knowledge of Faroese.

Marriage and children

During Princess Margrethe's stay in London, she met the French diplomat, Henri-Marie-Jean-André de Laborde de Monpezat, who was legation secretary at the Embassy of France in London. Their engagement was announced on October 5, 1966. They were married on June 10, 1967, at the Holmen Church in Copenhagen, and the wedding reception was held at Fredensborg Palace. Laborde de Monpezat received the style and title of "His Royal Highness Prince Henrik of Denmark" because of his new position as the spouse of the heir presumptive to the Danish throne. They were married for over fifty years, until his death on 13 February 2018.

Less than a year after the wedding, Princess Margrethe gave birth to her first child, a son, on 26 May 1968. By tradition, Danish kings were alternately named either Frederick or Christian. She chose to maintain this by assuming the position of a Christian, and thus named her elder son Frederik. The following year, a second child, named Joachim, was born on 7 June 1969.

Reign

Accession
Shortly after King Frederick IX delivered his New Year's Address to the Nation at the 1971/72 turn of the year, he fell ill, and died 14 days later on 14 January 1972. Margrethe succeeded to the throne at the age of 31, becoming the first female Danish sovereign under the new Act of Succession. She was proclaimed Queen from the balcony of Christiansborg Palace 15 January 1972 by Prime Minister Jens Otto Krag. Queen Margrethe II relinquished all the monarch's former titles except the title to Denmark, hence her style "By the Grace of God, Queen of Denmark". The Queen chose the motto: God's help, the love of The People, Denmark's strength.

In her first address to the people, Queen Margrethe II said:

Constitutional role
The Queen's main tasks are to represent the Kingdom abroad and to be a unifying figure at home. She performs the latter by opening exhibitions, attending anniversaries and inaugurating bridges, among other things. She receives foreign ambassadors, awards, honours and medals.

As an unelected public official, the Queen takes no part in party politics and does not express any political opinions. Although she has the right to vote, she opts not to do so to avoid even the appearance of partisanship.

The Queen holds a meeting with the prime minister and the foreign affairs minister every Wednesday, unless she or the prime minister is outside of the kingdom.

After an election where the incumbent prime minister does not have a majority behind him or her, the Queen holds a "Dronningerunde" (Queen's meeting) in which she meets the chairmen of each of the Danish political parties.

Each party has the choice of selecting a royal investigator to lead these negotiations or alternatively, give the incumbent prime minister the mandate to continue his or her government as is. In theory each party could choose its own leader as royal investigator, the social liberal Det Radikale Venstre did so in 2006, but often only one royal investigator is chosen plus the prime minister, before each election. The leader who, at that meeting succeeds in securing a majority of the seats in the Folketing, is by royal decree charged with the task of forming a new government. (No party has held an absolute majority in the Folketing since 1903.)

Once the government has been formed, it is formally appointed by the Queen. Officially, it is the Queen who is the head of government, and she therefore presides over the Council of State (privy council), where the acts of legislation which have been passed by the parliament are signed into law. In practice, nearly all of the Queen's formal powers are exercised by the Cabinet of Denmark.

The Queen is also the colonel-in-chief of the Princess of Wales's Royal Regiment (Queen's and Royal Hampshires), an infantry regiment of the British Army, following a tradition in her family.

Silver and Ruby Jubilees

Queen Margrethe II marked her Silver Jubilee in 1997 with a religious service and a gala dinner attended by fellow Scandinavian royals. She celebrated her Ruby Jubilee, the 40th year on the throne, on 14 January 2012. This was marked by a church service, concert, carriage procession, gala banquet at Christiansborg Palace and numerous TV interviews.

Immigration debate
In an interview within the 2016 book De dybeste rødder (The Deepest Roots), according to historians at the Saxo Institute of the University of Copenhagen she showed a change in attitude to immigration towards a more restrictive stance. She stated that the Danish people should have more explicitly clarified the rules and values of Danish culture in order to be able to teach them to new arrivals. She further stated that the Danes in general have underestimated the difficulties involved in successful integration of immigrants, exemplified with the rules of a democracy not being clarified to Muslim immigrants and a lack of readiness to enforce those rules. This was received as a change in line with the attitude of the Danish people.

Golden Jubilee

The Queen's Golden Jubilee was marked on 14 January 2022, with celebrations to take place later in the year. In September, following the death of Queen Elizabeth II, it was announced by the Royal House that it was "Her Majesty The Queen's wish that a number of adjustments be made" to the upcoming celebrations.

Personal life and interests
The official residences of the Queen are Amalienborg Palace (where she resides in Christian IX's Palace) in Copenhagen and Fredensborg Palace. Her summer residences are Marselisborg Palace near Aarhus and Gråsten Palace near Sønderborg, the former home of her mother, Queen Ingrid, who died in 2000.

Margrethe is an accomplished painter and has held many art shows over the years. Her illustrations—under the pseudonym Ingahild Grathmer—were used for Danish editions of The Lord of the Rings, which she was encouraged to illustrate in the early 1970s. She sent them to J. R. R. Tolkien, who was struck by the similarity of her drawings to his own style. Margrethe's drawings were redrawn by the British artist Eric Fraser for the Folio Society's English edition of The Lord of the Rings, first published in 1977 and reissued in 2002. In 2000, she illustrated Prince Henrik's poetry collection Cantabile. Another skill she possesses is costume designing, having designed the costumes for the Royal Danish Ballet's production of A Folk Tale and for the 2009 Peter Flinth film, De vilde svaner (The Wild Swans). She also designs her own clothes and is known for her colourful and sometimes eccentric clothing choices. Margrethe also wears designs by former Pierre Balmain designer Erik Mortensen, Jørgen Bender, and Birgitte Taulow. The Guardian in March 2013, listed her as one of the fifty best-dressed over 50s. In connection with her 80th birthday, British Vogue published an article calling her "An Unsung Style Heroine."

Margrethe has been a chain smoker and is well known for her tobacco habit. On 23 November 2006, the Danish newspaper B.T. printed an announcement from the Royal Court that the Queen would henceforth smoke only in private.

Health
The Queen has had a number of health issues. During the 1990s and early 2000s, she was operated several times in her right knee due to injuries and osteoarthritis. In 1994, she was treated for cervical cancer. In 2003, she underwent a 4.5 hour long operation for spinal stenosis.

On 9 February 2022, the Danish court disclosed in a press release that the Queen had contracted COVID-19. On 13 February, the Queen could leave home isolation after having had a mild case of the virus. On 21 September 2022, the Danish Royal House disclosed in a press release that the Queen had again contracted COVID-19, after attending the funeral of Elizabeth II, her third cousin, in London. She left home isolation on 26 September and resumed her official duties immediately, stating that she felt fine.

On 22 February 2023, the Queen underwent "major back surgery" at Rigshospitalet due to continued back pain. In a statement the following day, a representative for the Queen said that the surgery had gone well and that she had already been up for a walk. She will remain hospitalised for a period afterwards and undergo "a longer rehabilitation process" during which members of her family will undertake her engagements.

Family

The Queen has two children and eight grandchildren, all born at Rigshospitalet in Copenhagen:

 Crown Prince Frederik (born 26 May 1968). He married Mary Donaldson on 14 May 2004 at Copenhagen Cathedral, Copenhagen. The couple has four children:
 Prince Christian (born 15 October 2005)
 Princess Isabella (born 21 April 2007)
 Prince Vincent (born 8 January 2011)
 Princess Josephine (born 8 January 2011)
 Prince Joachim (born 7 June 1969). He married Alexandra Manley on 18 November 1995 at Frederiksborg Palace Church, Hillerød. They divorced on 8 April 2005. He then married Marie Cavallier on 24 May 2008 at Møgeltønder Church, Møgeltønder. Joachim has four children:
 Count Nikolai (born 28 August 1999)
 Count Felix (born 22 July 2002)
 Count Henrik (born 4 May 2009)
 Countess Athena (born 24 January 2012)

In 2008, the Queen announced that her descendants would bear the additional title of Count or Countess of Monpezat, in recognition of her husband's ancestry.

In 2022, the Queen announced, that from start of 2023 the descendants of Prince Joachim will only be able to use their titles of Count and Countess of Monpezat, their previous titles of Prince and Princess of Denmark ceasing to exist. To make the children have normal lives, the Queen "wants to create a framework for the four grandchildren, to a much greater degree, to be able to shape their own existence without being limited by the special considerations and obligations that a formal affiliation with the Royal House as an institution implies". Her son and grandchildren publicly expressed shock and confusion because of the decision. Later Queen Margrethe said she was sad about upsetting family members with her decision but she did not change it.

Honours
She is the 1,188th knight of the Order of the Golden Fleece in Spain, and only the seventh Lady of the Order of the Garter since 1901, when Edward VII appointed his consort a member. She is also Colonel-in-Chief of The Princess of Wales's Royal Regiment (Queen's and Royal Hampshires) in the United Kingdom.

Queen Margrethe II Land in Northeast Greenland was named in her honour on 16 April 1990 on the occasion of her 50th birthday.

National
 :
  Sovereign Knight of the Order of the Elephant
  Sovereign Knight Grand Commander with Collar of the Order of the Dannebrog
  Knight of the Decoration of the Cross of Honour of the Dannebrog (D.Ht.)
  Homeguard Medal of Merit
  25 years of Homeguard Service Medal
  Medal of Honour of the League of Civil Defence
  Medal of Honour of the Reserve Officers League
  100th Anniversary Medal of the Birth of King Christian X
  50th Anniversary Medal of the arrival of Queen Ingrid to Denmark
  100th Anniversary Medal of the Birth of King Frederik IX
  Queen Ingrid Commemorative Medal
 :
  Nersornaat Medal for Meritorious Service, 1st Class

Foreign
 : Grand Cross of the Order of the Liberator San Martín
 : Grand Cross of the Order  of Honour for Services to the Republic of Austria, Special Class
 : Knight Grand Cross of the Order of Leopold I
 : Grand Cross with Collar of the Order of the Southern Cross
 : Grand Cross of the Order of the Stara Planina
 : Grand Cross of the Order of the Merit of Chile
 : Grand Cross with Collar of the Order of the Cross of Terra Mariana
 : Grand Cross with Collar of the Order of the Nile
 : Grand Cross with Collar of the Order of the White Rose
 : Grand Cross of the Order of the Legion of Honour
 : Grand Cross Special Class of the Order of Merit of the Federal Republic of Germany
 Greece:
  Greek Royal Family: Dame Grand Cross of the Royal Order of Saints Olga and Sophia, Special Class
 : Grand Cross of the Order of the Redeemer
 : Grand Cross of the Order of the Falcon
  Iranian Imperial Family: Dame Grand Cordon of the Order of the Pleiades
 : Grand Cross with Collar of the Order of Merit of the Italian Republic
 : 
 Knight Grand Cordon with Collar of the Order of the Chrysanthemum
 Grand Cordon (Paulownia) of the Order of the Precious Crown
 : Knight Grand Cordon with Collar of the Order of Al-Hussein bin Ali
 : Grand Cross with Collar of the Order of the Three Stars
 : Grand Cross of the Order of Vytautas the Great
 : Knight of the Order of the Gold Lion of the House of Nassau
 : Grand Cross with Collar of the Order of the Aztec Eagle
 : Grand Cordon of the Order of Ouissam Alaouite
 : Knight Grand Cross of the Order of the Lion of the Netherlands
  Nepalese Royal Family: Member Grand Cross of the Order of Honour
 : 
 Knight Grand Cross with Collar of the Order of St. Olav
 Recipient of the Silver Jubilee Medal of King Olav V
 Recipient of the Silver Jubilee Medal of King Harald V
 : 
 Grand Cross of the Order of the White Eagle
 Grand Cross of the Order of Merit of the Republic of Poland
 :
 Grand Cross with Collar of the Military Order of Saint James of the Sword
 Grand Collar of the Order of Prince Henry
 : Grand Cross with Collar of the Order of the Star of Romania
 : Collar of the Order of Abdulaziz Al Saud
 : Grand Cross of the Order of the White Double Cross
 : Member 1st Class of the Order of Freedom of the Republic of Slovenia
 : 
 Knight of the Order of the Golden Fleece
 Knight Grand Cross with Collar of the Order of Charles III
 : 
 Member Grand Cross with Collar of the Royal Order of the Seraphim
 Recipient of the 85th Birthday Medal of King Gustaf VI Adolf
 Recipient of the 40th Birthday Medal of King Carl XVI Gustaf
 Recipient of the Ruby Jubilee Medal of King Carl XVI Gustaf
 : Grand Cross with Collar of the Order of Good Hope
 : Grand Cross with Collar of the Grand Order of Mugunghwa
 : 
 Knight of the Order of the Rajamitrabhorn
 Knight of the Order of the Royal House of Chakri
 : Grand Cordon of the Order of Al Kamal
 :
 Stranger Knight of the Order of the Garter (7th Lady since 1901; 1979)
 Recipient of the Royal Victorian Chain (1974)
: Great Star of the Order of the Yugoslav Star

Queen Margrethe is also Colonel in Chief of British infantry regiment, The Princess of Wales's Royal Regiment. This tradition started with what became the Buffs (the Royal East Kent Regiment) in 1689 with Prince George of Denmark (husband of Queen Anne); it was resurrected in the early 20th century when King Frederick VII was made Colonel in Chief of the Buffs (his sister, Princess Alexandra was married to King Edward VII). Since then the Danish Monarch has been the Colonel in Chief or Allied Colonel in Chief of the Buffs, Queen's Own Buffs, Queen's Regiment and Princess of Wales's Royal Regiment.

Nongovernmental organizations
 : Tree of Peace Memorial Plaque. Awarded on 16 April 2020, on the occasion of her 80th birthday anniversary. Plaque presented on behalf of Servare et Manere on 29 September 2020 to Henning Fode, Private Secretary of the Queen by Miroslav Wlachovský, the Ambassador of the Slovak Republic to the Kingdom of Denmark.

Arms, standards and monograms

See also

 Monarchy of Denmark
 List of current sovereign monarchs
 List of national leaders

Notes

References

Bibliography

External links

 The Queen's Homepage
 The Official Website of The Danish Monarchy
 Tapestries for HM The Queen of Denmark

1940 births
Aarhus University alumni
Alumni of Girton College, Cambridge
Alumni of the London School of Economics
Danish Lutherans
20th-century monarchs of Denmark
21st-century monarchs of Denmark
Danish people of Russian descent
Danish people of Swedish descent
20th-century Danish translators
English–Danish translators
Extra Ladies of the Order of the Garter
House of Glücksburg (Denmark)
House of Monpezat
Living people
People educated at North Foreland Lodge
Queens regnant in Europe
Tolkien artists
Translators to Danish

Grand Collars of the Order of Prince Henry
Grand Collars of the Order of Saint James of the Sword
Grand Commanders of the Order of the Dannebrog
Grand Cordons of the Order of Merit of the Republic of Poland
Grand Cordons of the Order of the Precious Crown
Grand Croix of the Légion d'honneur
Grand Crosses of the Order of the Liberator General San Martin
Grand Crosses of the Order of Vytautas the Great
Knights Grand Cross with Collar of the Order of Merit of the Italian Republic
Knights of the Golden Fleece of Spain
Recipients of Nersornaat
Recipients of the Collar of the Order of the Cross of Terra Mariana
Recipients of the Grand Star of the Decoration for Services to the Republic of Austria
Recipients of the Order of Freedom of the Republic of Slovenia
20th-century Danish women writers
Grand Crosses Special Class of the Order of Merit of the Federal Republic of Germany
20th-century women rulers
Daughters of kings
First Class of the Order of the Star of Romania
Recipients of the Order of the White Eagle (Poland)